The Battle of Plum Creek was a clash between allied Tonkawa, militia, and Rangers of the Republic of Texas and a huge Comanche war party under Chief Buffalo Hump, which took place near Lockhart, Texas, on August 12, 1840, following the Great Raid of 1840 as the Comanche war party returned to west Texas.<ref name=autogenerated1>The Comanche Barrier to South Plains Settlement: A Century and a Half of Savage Resistance to the Advancing White Frontier</cite>. Arthur H. Clarke Co. 1933.</ref>

Background

Following the Council House Fight of 1840 a group of Comanches led by the Penateka Comanche War Chief Buffalo Hump, warriors from his own band plus allies from various other Comanche bands, raided from West Texas all the way to the coast and the sea.  These Comanches were angered by the events of the Council House, in which Texans had killed the Comanche Chiefs when the Texans had raised a white flag of truce.

The Council House Fight

The Texan officials began the treaty talks with demands that were unacceptable or impossible to fulfill for the Comanches, such as the Comanche return all white captives, including the famous captive Cynthia Parker. Other white captives were with bands of the Comanche not represented at the talks.  As a show of good faith the Comanche chiefs brought in two captives, a Mexican boy and an adolescent girl named Matilda Lockhart. The Texans thought they were going against their word, because the Comanche chiefs did not return all of the white captives and figured they held back some of their white captives to guarantee their own safety. Exercising a premeditated plan of violating the immunity of the peace delegation, the Texas militiamen told the chiefs it was they that would indeed be held hostage to guarantee the release of their other white captives. Everyone panicked and drew their weapons. The militia began firing and the entire Comanche peace delegation was killed.<ref>The Comanches: Lords of the Southern Plains</cite>. Oklahoma Press. 1952.</ref>

The Great Raid of 1840

But Buffalo Hump was determined to do more than merely complain about what the Comanches viewed as a bitter betrayal.  Spreading word to the other bands of Comanches that he was raiding the white settlements in revenge, Buffalo Hump led the Great Raid of 1840. On this raid the Comanches went all the way from beyond the Edwards Plateau in West Texas to the cities of Victoria and Linnville on the Texas coast. In what may have been the largest organized raid by the Comanches to that point on Texas settlements, or an attack by Indians on any white city in the continental United States,<ref name=autogenerated2>The Comanches: Lords of the Southern Plains</cite>. University of Oklahoma Press. 1952.</ref> they raided and burned these towns, plundering at will. Linnville was the second largest port in Texas at that time. On the way back from the sea the Comanches were confronted by Texas rangers and militia in a fight called the Battle of Plum Creek (near the modern town of Lockhart).

The Battle of Plum Creek
The "battle" was really more of a running gun fight, as the Comanche War Party was trying to get back to the Llano Estacado with a huge herd of horses and mules they had captured, a large number of firearms, and other plunder such as mirrors, liquor, and cloth. Volunteers from Gonzales under Mathew Caldwell and from Bastrop under Ed Burleson gathered to intercept the Comanches.  Joined by Ranger companies and armed settlers hastily assembled as militia from central and east Texas, they confronted the Indians at Good's Crossing on Plum Creek, near the modern town of Lockhart (about 27 miles south of Austin). According to Arizona historian Robert M. Utley, the battle of Plum Creek was a disaster for the Commanche. Most of the loot they took was recovered, and the Texans involved in the battle suffered only one death.

Thomas J. Pilgrim took part in the Battle of Plum Creek.

Aftermath
John Moore and the La Grange volunteers hunted down a Commanche war party that had escaped the battle and all but exterminated them. Buffalo Hump continued to raid white settlements until 1844, when he negotiated peace, and after Texas acquired statehood he agreed to settle his band into the Treaty of Council Springs, while European settlers took over the former Commanche land. Buffalo Hump went on to the Commanche Reservation in 1856, but left after two years of starvation, fleeing to the Wichita Mountains where his band was attacked by U.S. troops, who forced them back on to the reservation. The town of Linnville never recovered from the Great Raid, most of its residents moving to Port Lavaca, the new settlement established on the bay three and one half miles southwest by displaced Linnville residents.

Notes

References 
 Bial, Raymond. Lifeways: The Comanche. New York: Benchmark Books, 2000.
 Brice, Donaly E. The Great Comanche Raid: Boldest Indian Attack on the Texas Republic McGowan Book Co. 1987
 "Comanche" Skyhawks Native American Dedication (August 15, 2005)
 "Comanche" on the History Channel (August 26, 2005)
 Lodge, Sally. Native American People: The Comanche. Vero Beach, Florida 32964: Rourke Publications, Inc., 1992.
 Lund, Bill. Native Peoples: The Comanche Indians. Mankato, Minnesota: Bridgestone Books, 1997.
 Mooney, Martin. The Junior Library of American Indians: The Comanche Indians. New York: Chelsea House Publishers, 1993.
 Native Americans: Comanche (August 13, 2005).
 Richardson, Rupert N. The Comanche Barrier to South Plains Settlement: A Century and a Half of Savage Resistance to the Advancing White Frontier. Glendale, CA: Arthur H. Clark Company, 1933.
 Rollings, Willard. Indians of North America: The Comanche. New York: Chelsea House Publishers, 1989.
 Secoy, Frank. Changing Military Patterns on the Great Plains. Monograph of the American Ethnological Society, No. 21. Locust Valley, NY: J. J. Augustin, 1953.
 Streissguth, Thomas. Indigenous Peoples of North America: The Comanche. San Diego: Lucent Books Incorporation, 2000.
 "The Texas Comanches" on Texas Indians (August 14, 2005).
 Wallace, Ernest, and E. Adamson Hoebel. The Comanches: Lords of the Southern Plains. Norman: University of Oklahoma Press, 1952.

Online sources
 
 Buffalo Hump, Texas Indians.com
 Battle of Plum Creek, Lone Star Junction
 Plum Creek battlefield received a historic marker in 1978. Battle of Plum Creek: near intersection of US 183 and SH 142 in Lions Park: Texas marker #9783

Plum Creek
Battle of Plum Creek
Plum Creek
Plum Creek
Comanche tribe
Plum Creek
Plum Creek
August 1840 events